Dubovica is a village and municipality in Sabinov District in the Prešov Region of north-eastern Slovakia.

History
In historical records the village was first mentioned in 1278.

Geography
The municipality lies at an altitude of 419 metres and covers an area of 17.156 km². It has a population of about 1475 people.

Genealogical resources

The records for genealogical research are available at the state archive "Statny Archiv in Presov, Slovakia"

 Roman Catholic church records (births/marriages/deaths): 1717-1895 (parish A)
 Greek Catholic church records (births/marriages/deaths): 1844-1951 (parish B)

See also
 List of municipalities and towns in Slovakia

External links
https://web.archive.org/web/20071217080336/http://www.statistics.sk/mosmis/eng/run.html
Surnames of living people in Dubovica

Villages and municipalities in Sabinov District
Šariš